

Events 

 January–June 
 January–March – Archangelsk is founded as New Kholmogory in northern Russia, by Ivan the Terrible.
 January 11 – Sir Walter Mildmay is given a royal licence to found Emmanuel College, Cambridge in England.
 March 18 (N.S. March 28) – Ivan the Terrible, ruler of Russia since 1533, dies; he is succeeded as Tsar by his son, Feodor.
 May 17 – The conflict between Toyotomi Hideyoshi and Tokugawa Ieyasu culminates in the Battle of Nagakute.
 June 1 – With the death of the Duc d'Anjou, the Huguenot Henry of Navarre becomes heir-presumptive to the throne of France.
 June 4 – Walter Raleigh sends Philip Amadas and Arthur Barlowe to explore the Outer Banks of Virginia (modern-day North Carolina), with a view to establishing an English colony; they locate Roanoke Island.
 June 11 – Walk (modern-day Valka and Valga, towns in Latvia and Estonia respectively), receives city rights from Polish king Stefan Bathory.

 July–December 
 July – The Siege of Antwerp (1584–1585) by the Spanish begins.
 July 5 – The Maronite College is established in Rome, Papal States.
 July 10 – William the Silent, Prince of Orange, is assassinated in Delft, the first ruler to be killed by a handgun.
 September 17 – Ghent falls into the hands of Alexander Farnese, governor of the Spanish Netherlands.
 December – The Treaty of Joinville is signed secretly between the French Catholic League and Spain.

 Date unknown 
 Ratu Hijau becomes queen regnant of the Malay Patani Kingdom.
 Belgian cartographer and geographer Abraham Ortelius features Ming dynasty-era Chinese carriages with masts and sails, in his atlas Theatrum Orbis Terrarum; concurrent and later Western writers also take note of this peculiar Chinese invention.
 This year, according to Italian heretic Jacopo Brocardo, is regarded as an apocalyptic inauguration of a major new cycle.

Births 

 January 1 – Charles de Lorme, French physician (d. 1678)
 January 7 – Karan Singh II, Maharana of Mewar (d. 1628)
 January 29 – Frederick Henry, Prince of Orange (d. 1647)
 February 9 – Francesco Maria Richini, Italian architect (d. 1658)
 February 12 – Caspar Barlaeus, Dutch polymath (d. 1648)
 February 18 – Philippe de Carteret II, governor of Jersey (d. 1643)
 February 19 – Angelo Nardi, Italian painter (d. 1664)
 February 26 – Albert VI of Bavaria (d. 1666)
 March 15 – Philip, Duke of Schleswig-Holstein-Sonderburg-Glücksburg (d. 1663)
 March 22 – Grégoire de Saint-Vincent, Flemish Jesuit mathematician (d. 1667)
 March 26 – John II, Count Palatine of Zweibrücken (d. 1635)
 March 29 – Ferdinando Fairfax, 2nd Lord Fairfax of Cameron, English parliamentary general (d. 1648)
 April 6 – Bridget de Vere, Countess of Berkshire, English noblewoman (d. 1630)
 April 10 – Sibylle Elisabeth of Württemberg, Duchess consort of Saxony (d. 1606)
 April 19 – John Hales, English theologian (d. 1656)
 April 20 – Sir John Langham, 1st Baronet, English Member of Parliament (d. 1671)
 April 23 – Jorge de Cárdenas y Manrique de Lara, Spanish noble (d. 1644)
 April 29 – Melchior Teschner, German cantor, composer and theologian (d. 1635)
 May 17 – John Jacob Hess, Swiss Anabaptist minister and martyr (d. 1639)
 May 23 – Maximilian von und zu Trauttmansdorff, Austrian diplomat (d. 1650)
 May 27 – Michael Altenburg, German composer (d. 1640)
 June 6 – Yuan Chonghuan, Chinese politician, military general and writer (d. 1630)
 June 15 – Anna Sophie of Anhalt, German noblewoman (d. 1652)
 June 16 – Archduchess Maria of Austria (d. 1649)
 June 25 – Richard Strode, English politician (d. 1669)
 June 26 – Robert Cholmondeley, 1st Earl of Leinster, English politician (d. 1659)
 July 17 – Agnes of Brandenburg, Duchess of Pomerania, later Duchess of Saxe-Lauenburg (d. 1629)
 July 26 – Gaspard III de Coligny, Marshal of France (d. 1646)
 August 1 – Emanuel Scrope, 1st Earl of Sunderland, English statesman (d. 1630)
 August 6 – Robert Pierrepont, 1st Earl of Kingston-upon-Hull, English soldier (d. 1643)
 August 10 – John Casimir, Count of Erbach-Breuberg (1606–1627) (d. 1627)
 August 11 – Philip Ernest, Count of Hohenlohe-Langenburg (1610–1628) (d. 1628)
 August 13 – Theophilus Howard, 2nd Earl of Suffolk, English politician (d. 1640)
 August 28 – Richard Treat, American city founder (d. 1669)
 August 29 – Patrick Young, Scottish librarian (d. 1652)
 September 11 – Thomas van Erpe, Dutch Orientialist, cartographer (d. 1624)
 September 13 – Francis Julius of Saxe-Lauenburg, Prince (d. 1634)
 September 15 – Georg Rudolf Weckherlin, German poet (d. 1653)
 September 16 – Giulio Roma, Italian Catholic cardinal (d. 1652)
 September 17 – John Finch, 1st Baron Finch, English judge (d. 1660)
 October 10 – Philip Herbert, 4th Earl of Pembroke (d. 1650)
 November 3 – Jean-Pierre Camus, French Catholic bishop (d. 1652)
 November 10 – Catherine of Sweden, Countess Palatine of Kleeburg (d. 1638)
 November 16 – Barbara Sophie of Brandenburg, duchess consort and later regent of Württemberg (d. 1636)
 November 18 – Gaspar de Crayer, Flemish painter (d. 1669)
 December 15 – Queen Inmok, Korean royal consort (d. 1632)
 December 16 – John Selden, English jurist (d. 1654)
 December 25 – Margaret of Austria, Queen of Spain (d. 1611)
 December 27 – Philipp Julius, Duke of Pomerania (d. 1625)
 December 28 – Juan de Dicastillo, Spanish theologian (d. 1653)
 date unknown
 William Baffin, English explorer (d. 1622)
 Francis Beaumont, English dramatist (d. 1616)
 Antonio Cifra, Italian composer (d. 1629)
 Hu Zhengyan, Chinese artist, printmaker, calligrapher and publisher (d. 1674)
 Miyamoto Musashi, Japanese samurai, artist and philosopher (d. 1645)
 Mathieu Molé, French statesman (d. 1656)
 Chiara Varotari, Italian Baroque painter (d. 1663)
 Herman Wrangel, Swedish soldier and politician (d. 1643)

Deaths 

 January 4 – Tobias Stimmer, Swiss painter and drawer (b. 1539)
 January 11 – Bernal Díaz del Castillo, Spanish constiquador (b. 1496)
 January 15 – Martha Leijonhufvud, politically active Swedish noble (b. 1520)
 February 18 – Antonio Francesco Grazzini, Italian writer (b. 1503)
 February 19 – Anna de' Medici, Tuscan princess (b. 1569)
 February 27 – Yi I of Joseon, Korean Confucian scholar (b. 1536)
 March 10 – Thomas Norton, English politician and writer (b. 1532)
 March 18 – Tsar Ivan IV of Russia (b. 1530)
 May 10 – Luigi Cornaro, Italian Catholic cardinal (b. 1517)
 March 12 – Kasper Franck, German theologian (b. 1543)
 April 13 – Jan Borukowski, royal secretary of Poland (b. 1524)
 April 27 – Mikołaj "the Red" Radziwiłł, Polish magnate (b. 1512)
 May 18 – Ikeda Tsuneoki, Japanese daimyō and military commander (in battle) (b. 1536)
 May 25 – Prospero Spani, Italian sculptor (b. 1516)
 June 10 – François, Duke of Anjou (b. 1555)
 June 13 – János Zsámboky, Hungarian scholar (b. 1531)
 July 10 
 Francis Throckmorton, conspirator against Queen Elizabeth I of England (executed; b. 1554)
 William the Silent, Prince of Orange (assassinated; b. 1533)
 July 12 – Steven Borough, English explorer (b. 1525)
 July 14 – Balthasar Gérard, French assassin of William the Silent (executed; b. 1557)
 July 23 – John Day, English Protestant printer (b. 1522)
 August 12 – Carolus Sigonius, Italian humanist (b. 1524)
 August 22 – Jan Kochanowski, Polish writer (b. 1530)
 October – Colin Campbell, 6th Earl of Argyll, Scottish noble and politician (b. 1541)
 October 17 – Richard Gwyn, Welsh Catholic martyr, canonised
 November 3 – Charles Borromeo, Italian Roman Catholic cardinal, canonised (b. 1538)
 November 17 – Eric II, Duke of Brunswick-Lüneburg (b. 1528)
 December 26 – Giovanni Francesco Commendone, Italian Catholic cardinal (b. 1523)
 date unknown
 Elena Anguissola, Italian painter and nun (b. c. 1532)
 Michał Wiśniowiecki, Polish–Lithuanian noble  (b. 1529)

References 

 
Leap years in the Gregorian calendar